I-72, later I-172, was a  cruiser submarine of the KD6 sub-class built for the Imperial Japanese Navy (IJN) during the 1930s. She served in the early months of World War II, supporting the attack on Pearl Harbor, patrolling in Hawaiian waters in early 1942, and taking part in the Guadalcanal campaign before she was sunk in November 1942.

Construction and commissioning
Built by Mitsubishi at Kobe, Japan, I-72 was laid down on 16 December 1933 and launched on 6 April 1935. She was completed and accepted into Imperial Japanese Navy service on 7 January 1937.

Service history

Pre-World War II
Upon commissioning, I-72 was assigned to Submarine Division 20 in the Kure Naval District. While operating on the surface in limited visibility on 5 May 1938, she collided at about 10:00 with the Japanese 60-gross register ton motor vessel  in the Seto Inland Sea west of Kurahashi-jima, Japan. I-72 suffered only minor damage, but Hachiyo Maru sank about two minutes after the collision.

She arrived at Kwajalein Atoll on 20 November 1941.

World War II

First war patrol
On 23 November 1941, I-72 departed Kwajalein to begin what would become her first war patrol. She received the message "Climb Mount Niitaka 1208" from the Combined Fleet on 2 December 1941, indicating that war with the Allies would commence on 8 December 1941 Japan time (7 December 1941 in Hawaii). She arrived in the Hawaiian Islands on 5 December 1941 and conducted a reconnaissance of Kalohi Channel between Lānaʻi and Molokaʻi. She then investigated Lahaina Roads off Maui to determine if the U.S. fleet was anchored there, and on 6 December 1941 she radioed the Japanese Carrier Striking Force with the news that no U.S. warships were at Lahaina Roads.

On 7 December 1941, I-72 took up station off Pearl Harbor between I-70 and I-73. The Japanese attack on Pearl Harbor took place that morning, bringing Japan and the United States into World War II. On the evening of 16 December 1941, she surfaced off Hilo Bay and shelled Hilo, Hawaii, with her  deck gun. Prusa, which was on a voyage from Honolulu, Hawaii, to Baltimore, Maryland, sank at  nine minutes later. I-72 surfaced to identify Prusa and illuminated Prusa′s lifeboats with her searchlight, then submerged and continued her patrol. She returned to Kwajalein on 28 December 1941.

Second war patrol
On 12 January 1942, I-72 departed Kwajalein with I-71 and I-73 for her second war patrol. I-72 arrived in her patrol area on 21 January 1942.

On 23 January, I-72 encountered the 7,383-displacement ton United States Navy oiler , which was proceeding unescorted to a rendezvous with Task Force 11. I-72′s first torpedo, fired at 03:10, struck Neches amidships but failed to detonate. Her second torpedo hit Neches on her starboard side aft, destroying her engine room. I-72′s third torpedo struck Neches on her port side. The loss of Neches prevented Task Force 11 — centered around the aircraft carrier  — from refueling, forcing it to cancel a planned air strike against Japanese forces on Wake Island and return to Pearl Harbor.

On 16 February 1942, I-72 returned to Kwajalein.

Third war patrol

I-72 departed Kwajalein on 18 February 1942 with I-71 to patrol in defense of Rabaul, which the U.S. Navy's Task Force 11 was approaching with an intention to launch air raids against Japanese forces and bases there. After Task Force 11 lost the element of surprise, however, it withdrew, and the two submarines were diverted to patrol areas east of Wake Island. After an uneventful patrol, I-72 proceeded to Japan, where she arrived on 5 March 1942 for repairs at Kure.

March–September 1942
While I-72 was at Kure, Submarine Division 20 was disbanded on 20 March 1942, and she was reassigned that day to Submarine Division 12. She departed Kure on 15 April 1942, visited Yokosuka from 3 to 10 May 1942, and returned to Kure on 12 May 1942 for additional repairs. While she was there, she was redesignated I-172 on 20 May 1942. With her repairs complete, she departed Kure on 22 August 1942 and proceeded to Truk, where she arrived on 28 August 1942.

I-172 departed Truk on 30 August 1942. The Guadalcanal campaign had begun on 7 August 1942, and her main task was to perform a reconnaissance mission in the Guadalcanal area. She returned to Truk on 30 September 1942.

Fourth war patrol
With the commander of Submarine Division 12 embarked, I-172 departed Truk on 12 October 1942 for her fourth war patrol. Her orders called for her to support an attack by Type A midget submarines against Allied shipping off Guadalcanal's Lunga Point. She remained on this duty through the end of the Battle of the Santa Cruz Islands of 25–27 October 1942. Group A was dissolved on 28 October 1942, and I-172 then deployed to waters southwest of San Cristóbal with orders attack Allied shipping supplying American forces on Guadalcanal.

Loss

Sources agree that I-172 was sunk while operating southwest of San Cristóbal, but disagree on the date and cause.

A large quantity of oil appeared on the surface and was still visible the next day.

According to The Imperial Japanese Navy Page (combinedfleet.com), on 3 November 1942 I-172 sighted a convoy of American transports southwest of San Cristóbal bound for Lunga Point on Guadalcanal. Thirty seconds after the explosion of the last depth charge, McCalla′s crew heard another underwater explosion, then a second explosion 30 seconds after that, and finally a third explosion after another three minutes. After the third explosion, McCalla lost her sonar contact on the submarine, and her crew noticed a heavy smell of oil near . It was the end of I-172.

The Dictionary of American Naval Fighting Ships notes that McCalla conducted a depth charge attack on 2 November 1942, but makes not mention of McCalla sinking a submarine on either 2 or 3 November 1942. It claims that early on the morning of 10 November 1942, while passing between San Cristobal and Guadalcanal en route to Aola Bay on Guadalcanal, USS Southard (DMS-10) encountered I-172 operating on the surface. I-172 submerged, and Southard commenced her first depth-charge attack. Southard lost contact with I-172 and did not regain it again until 06:07, almost three and one-half hours later. Over the next three hours Southard made five more depth-charge runs. After the last barrage, she sighted oil on the surface. She moved in to investigate. Upon reaching the oil slick, Southards crew could find no further evidence of damage, and she steamed on through the slick. Then the bow dropped about 10 degrees, and the submarine sank rapidly by the stern. Though absolute confirmation of a kill was never received, all evidence strongly indicated that the submarine had indeed sunk. Combinedfleet.com states that "Although USS Southard (DMS-10) is often credited with I-172′s sinking, her target was more likely I-15.

On 27 November 1942, the Imperial Japanese Navy declared that I-172 was presumed lost off Guadalcanal along with all 91 men on board. She was struck from the Navy List 15 December 1942.

Notes

References

1935 ships
Ships built by Mitsubishi Heavy Industries
World War II submarines of Japan
Kaidai-class submarines
Maritime incidents in 1938
Maritime incidents in November 1942
Attack on Pearl Harbor
World War II shipwrecks in the Pacific Ocean
Japanese submarines lost during World War II
Ships lost with all hands